Symplocos rayae is a species of flowering plant in the genus Symplocos. The plant is endemic to the mountainous interior of the island of Borneo. The plant has been described as being around 8 m tall with a smooth brown trunk around 10 cm in diameter. The leaves of S. rayae are dark green and the fruits of the plant are greenish-white.

References 

rayae
Endemic flora of Borneo